Benjamin Roberts (1880 – 17 November 1952) was a New Zealand politician of the Labour Party and a Cabinet Minister.

Biography

Roberts was born in 1880 in Liverpool. He started work as a farm labourer at 13. He brought his family to New Zealand in 1907 and settled in Carterton.

He was elected to Parliament in the Wairarapa electorate in 1935, and remained a member of parliament to 1946, when he retired.

He was both Minister of Agriculture and Minister of Marketing, from 1943 to 1946 in the First Labour Government under Peter Fraser.

Roberts died in 1952. His first wife, Mary Roberts, had died in 1936.

Notes

References

New Zealand Labour Party MPs
Members of the Cabinet of New Zealand
1880 births
1952 deaths
Members of the New Zealand House of Representatives
New Zealand MPs for North Island electorates
Unsuccessful candidates in the 1925 New Zealand general election
Politicians from Liverpool
English emigrants to New Zealand
Unsuccessful candidates in the 1928 New Zealand general election